Zeng Tao (born 19 May 1993) is a Chinese rower.

He won a medal at the 2019 World Rowing Championships.

References

External links

1993 births
Living people
Chinese male rowers
World Rowing Championships medalists for China